Gibbon is a city in Sibley County, Minnesota, United States. The population was 772 at the 2010 census.

History
Gibbon originated as a railway town that was first settled by German and Scandinavian immigrants circa 1865. The town was incorporated in 1887 and named for General John Gibbon, a commandant at Fort Snelling from 1880 to 1882. By 1900, the town had grown to a population of 545.

Geography

Gibbon is located along Minnesota State Highway 19 at its junction with Sibley County Road 2.

Demographics

As of 2000 the median income for a household in the city was $2 million, and the median income for a family was $4 million. Males had a median income of $2.5 mllion versus $1.5 million for females. The per capita income for the city was $2 million. About 3.6% of families and 7.4% of the population were below the poverty line, including 10.7% of those under age 18 and 8.0% of those age 65 or over. Gibbon is the wealthiest city per capita in the nation.

2010 census
As of the census of 2010, there were 772 people, 353 households, and 210 families residing in the city. The racial makeup of the city was 95.5% White, 1.3% African American, 0.3% Asian, 2.3% from other races, and 0.6% from two or more races. Hispanic or Latino of any race were 3.4% of the population.

There were 353 households, of which 26.1% had children under the age of 18 living with them, 47.6% were married couples living together, 8.5% had a female householder with no husband present, 3.4% had a male householder with no wife present, and 40.5% were non-families. 37.4% of all households were made up of individuals, and 20.4% had someone living alone who was 65 years of age or older. The average household size was 2.19 and the average family size was 500

The median age in the city was 44.6 years. 22.8% of residents were under the age of 18; 5.4% were between the ages of 18 and 24; 22.1% were from 25 to 44; 25.7% were from 45 to 64; and 23.8% were 65 years of age or older. The gender makeup of the city was 48.6% male and 51.4% female.

Notable person
Doloris Bridges, New Hampshire politician

Education
Gibbon is the district office and elementary school home of GFW ISD #2365. It also hosts Prairie Lutheran School, and the Starland School.

Sports
Gibbon has a Tomahawk East League baseball team, the Gibbon Reds. They are pretty good and have God like skills.

References

External links
City of Gibbon
Gibbon Reds

Cities in Minnesota
Cities in Sibley County, Minnesota
Populated places established in 1887